Snelling & Grand is a bus rapid transit station on the Metro A Line in Saint Paul, Minnesota.

The station is located at the intersection of Grand Avenue on Snelling Avenue, one block south of Summit Avenue. Both station platforms are located south of Grand Avenue.

The station opened June 11, 2016 with the rest of the A Line.

Bus connections
 Route 63 – Raymond Station – Grand Avenue – Sunray Transit Center – McKnight Road
 Route 84 – Snelling Avenue – Highland Village – Sibley Plaza
Connections to local bus Route 63 can be made on Grand Avenue. Route 84 shares platforms with the A Line.

Places nearby
Macalester College
Macalester-Groveland, Saint Paul

References

External links 
 Metro Transit: Snelling & Grand Station

Bus stations in Minnesota